MainConcept GmbH is a software company founded in Germany by Markus Moenig and Thomas Zabel. They specialize in developing video/audio codecs and also applications and plug-ins related to video/audio encoding. They are a subsidiary of Endeavor Streaming,  with employees in Germany, Russia, United States and Japan.

History

MainConcept is a video codec supplier founded in 1993 in Aachen, Germany and a board member of the MPEG Industry Forum. The Russian video codec company Elecard discussed an opportunity to become part of the company between April 2005 and August 2006. In November 2007 MainConcept became a wholly owned subsidiary of DivX, Inc. In June 2010, Sonic Solutions acquired DivX and its subsidiaries in a cash and stock deal valued at $323 million. Rovi Corporation acquired Sonic Solutions (including the MainConcept business) in February 2011 and later sold off the DivX and MainConcept businesses in April 2014. In February 2015, NeuLion, Inc. acquired DivX, LLC including the MainConcept business.

The company has specialized in video codecs since 1995 with a focus on standards, e.g. H.264/AVC, MPEG, AVC-Intra etc.

MainConcept delivered its first MPEG-1/2 Codec in 2001 and its first H.264/MPEG-4 AVC Codec in 2004.

In August 2007, Adobe Systems licensed the H.264 and AAC technology developed by MainConcept for integration into its Adobe Flash Player software. In April 2010 MainConcept signed a strategic collaboration agreement with AMD to accelerate digital video encode. In September 2010, the company launched MainConcept Reference 2.1 for Mac/Windows providing enhanced support for Mac OS 10.5/10.6, Apple iPad, HTML5.

On June 4, 2013, Rovi Corporation released the MainConcept HEVC SDK 1.0. SDK 1.0 supports Smart Adaptive Bitrate Encoding Technology (SABET) which allows for the simultaneous encoding of up to 10 video output streams with reduced computing cost. SDK 1.0 is available for Windows and SDK 1.0.1, which will be released in July 2013, will add support for Linux and Mac OS X. SDK 1.0 supports the Main profile while SDK 2.0, which will be released in Q4 2013, will add support for the Main 10 profile.

IP licensing and SDK products

Application and plug-in products

Supported Formats

Awards
2007, 2008 and 2009 - the Moscow State University ranked MainConcept's H.264 codec first in its annual H.264-codec comparison.

See also
 High Efficiency Video Coding (HEVC)

References

External links
mainconcept.com

Software companies established in 1999
Software companies of Germany
Audio codecs
Video codecs
MPEG
1999 establishments in Germany